Giulio I Arese (1560 – 5 February 1627) was a Milanese nobleman and politician, elected president of the Senate of Milan in 1619 under Phillip III. 

The grandson of jurist Giulio Clari and member of the Arese family, he was a founding member of the Accademia degli Inquieti in Pavia in 1594. 
He is buried in San Vittore al Corpo, Milan.

Sources 
 F. Calvi, Il patriziato milanese, Milano 1875, pp. 149-161
 B. Caizzi, Le classi sociali nella vita milanese, cap. XI, Il declino spagnolo, 1958, p. 350
 V. U. Crivelli Visconti, La nobiltà lombarda, Bologna 1972, p. 73

References 

1560 births
1627 deaths
Nobility from Milan

17th-century Italian politicians